Nedeljko Milosavljević (Serbian Cyrillic: Недељко Милосављевић; born 12 December 1960) is a Serbian retired footballer.

Playing career

Club career
He was part of the Red Star Belgrade squad that played in the 1979 UEFA Cup Final.

International career
He was also part of the Yugoslavia U20 squad that took part in the 1979 FIFA World Youth Championship.

References

1960 births
Living people
People from Aranđelovac
Yugoslav footballers
Serbian footballers
Red Star Belgrade footballers
FK Proleter Zrenjanin players
Yugoslav First League players
Serbian expatriate footballers
Expatriate footballers in Austria
Association football forwards